Lake Annette is a city in Cass County, Missouri, United States. The population was 100 at the 2010 census. It is part of the Kansas City metropolitan area.

Geography
Lake Annette is located at  (38.654862, -94.505646).

Demographics

2010 census
As of the census of 2010, there were 100 people, 49 households, and 25 families living in the city. The racial makeup of the city was 92.0% White, 1.0% Native American, and 7.0% from two or more races. Hispanic or Latino of any race were 2.0% of the population.

There were 49 households, of which 16.3% had children under the age of 18 living with them, 36.7% were married couples living together, 6.1% had a female householder with no husband present, 8.2% had a male householder with no wife present, and 49.0% were non-families. 38.8% of all households were made up of individuals, and 16.3% had someone living alone who was 65 years of age or older. The average household size was 2.04 and the average family size was 2.56.

The median age in the city was 46 years. 13% of residents were under the age of 18; 9% were between the ages of 18 and 24; 26% were from 25 to 44; 33% were from 45 to 64; and 19% were 65 years of age or older. The gender makeup of the city was 49.0% male and 51.0% female.

2000 census
As of the census of 2000, there were 163 people, 83 households, and 41 families living in the city. The population density was 1,033.5 people per square mile (393.3/km2). There were 110 housing units at an average density of 697.4 per square mile (265.4/km2). The racial makeup of the city was 95.09% White, 1.23% African American, 1.84% Native American, and 1.84% from two or more races. Hispanic or Latino of any race were 1.84% of the population.

There were 83 households, out of which 18.1% had children under the age of 18 living with them, 38.6% were married couples living together, 6.0% had a female householder with no husband present, and 49.4% were non-families. 41.0% of all households were made up of individuals, and 9.6% had someone living alone who was 65 years of age or older. The average household size was 1.96 and the average family size was 2.64.

In the city the population was spread out, with 17.2% under the age of 18, 6.7% from 18 to 24, 28.2% from 25 to 44, 35.0% from 45 to 64, and 12.9% who were 65 years of age or older. The median age was 44 years. For every 100 females, there were 129.6 males. For every 100 females age 18 and over, there were 128.8 males.

The median income for a household in the city was $22,292, and the median income for a family was $35,417. Males had a median income of $32,500 versus $17,292 for females. The per capita income for the city was $18,623. About 19.4% of families and 23.4% of the population were below the poverty line, including 66.7% of those under the age of eighteen and 10.5% of those 65 or over.

References

Cities in Cass County, Missouri
Cities in Missouri
Populated places established in 1982